The HMZ-T1 is a visor style head mounted display manufactured by Sony Corporation in 2011.  Also known as the Sony Personal HD & 3D Viewer, the HMZ-T1 is composed of two different hardware devices, the Visor and the External Processor Unit.

Visor 
The visor consists of 2 miniature OLED displays providing video and headphones providing stereo sound.  The two displays can be driven independently and offer stereoscopic video when used with a compatible video format.

Specifications 
The following specifications apply to the Visor portion of the HMZ-T1.

Fit 
The visor is worn on the head and kept in place using a combination of a headband and a forehead cushion.  Sony has produced a short video detailing the method for getting an accurate fit when using the HMZ-T1: How to use Sony Personal 3D Viewer Headset

External Processor Unit

Specifications 
The following specifications apply to the External Processor portion of the HMZ-T1.

Reviews
It has been reviewed by CNET, CNN, PC Mag, and Time.

References 

Sony products